Doloris may refer to :

Castrum doloris is a name for the structure and decorations sheltering or accompanying the catafalque or bier that signify the prestige or high estate of the deceased.
Lacus Doloris (Latin for "Lake of Sorrow") is a small lunar mare located in the Terra Nivium region at 17.1° N, 9.0° E. 
Salvifici doloris is a 1984 apostolic letter by John Paul II on the Christian meaning of suffering.
Solamen miseris socios habuisse doloris is a useful Latin literary phrase having conceptual counterparts in other languages.